Yadanabon was the first chief queen consort of King Sithu I of Pagan Dynasty of Burma (Myanmar). The queen was the mother of Crown Prince Min Shin Saw. She was still alive in 1151/52 (513 ME) when she successfully persuaded her husband to change the prison sentence for Min Shin Saw to an exile. The queen apparently did not outlive her husband; according to the royal chronicles, she was succeeded as chief queen (Usaukpan) by Ti Lawka Sanda Dewi.

References

Bibliography
 
 
 

|-

Chief queens consort of Pagan
Year of birth unknown
Year of death unknown
11th-century Burmese women
12th-century Burmese women